Weqaya, known also as Weqaya Takaful Insurance and Reinsurance Company, is one of the largest joint stock companies in Saudi Arabia, with a paid up capital of SR 200 Million. Weqaya Head Offices are located in Riyadh and there are three Regional Offices in Jeddah and Khobar.

History
Weqaya Takaful Insurance and Reinsurance company was incorporated in 2009 as a Saudi joint-stock company with SR 200 million in paid-up capital. Weqaya is supported by leading Reinsurers and underwrites all types of risks in protection, savings, medical insurance, general insurance and reinsurance and goes the extra mile to tailor special covers and develop innovative Takaful products and services to satisfy the specific needs and expectations of the customers. 
Weqaya is proud to introduce a Sharia-compliant and added-value Takaful products and services for both individuals and businesses.

Establishment
The idea of founding Weqaya Takaful Insurance and Reinsurance company has been resulted from the convergence of investment and economic visions for a number of investment companies specializing in private investments with the experienced insurance technical vision and strategy for a number of insurance experts, known in the Kingdom of Saudi Arabia, in order to bridge the side of the gap in the Saudi insurance market, which is still in the process of development and growth, by putting forward a package of insurance products and services stemming from the needs of the market and combined with a real and technical market study for the Saudi insurance market, and based on the professional management and technical experience that can manage the high risks in the market of insurance.

Therefore; Weqaya Takaful Insurance and Reinsurance Company has been established based on the Council of Ministers decision No. (180), dated 30/6/2008 and the Royal Decree No. (M/34), dated 1/7/2008, to establish Weqaya Takaful insurance and reinsurance company as a Saudi joint-stock company.

Weqaya’s Capital is (200,000,000) two hundred million Saudi riyals. The company has the right to practice the business of Takaful insurance in several fields such as protection, savings, medical insurance, general insurance and reinsurance, in accordance to the cooperative insurance supervision system, its executive regulations as well as any further amendments that may be introduced, and as per the rules and regulations of the Kingdom of Saudi Arabia.

Strategies and objectives

Weqaya’s main strategy is to create a distinct image and identity, as a specialized Takaful insurance company, by offering Takaful insurance services and products, to the Saudi business sector and all the other sectors of Saudi community, in line with principals and regulations of Sharia, and by focusing on building one of the best professional teams in the insurance companies in the Kingdom by attracting the most qualified professional known, in addition to focus on e-insurance services, by developing it to be ready for actual implementation.

Weqaya focuses on its strategy, to offer wide range of innovative products and non-traditional services that will contribute to the expansion of the Saudi insurance market, horizontally in terms of services and products, and vertically in terms of business growth and activities.

Suspension by CMA for share trading at Tadawul

CMA announces that based on the announcement by the Saudi Arabian Monetary Agency dated 5/8/1435 H corresponding to 3/6/2014 that included: "after viewing the first quarter financial statements from the current year 2014 submitted by Weqaya Takaful Insurance and Reinsurance Company to the Agency on 20/6/1435 H corresponding to 20/04/2014 showing that the company's accumulated losses reached 97% of its share capital, the Agency has assigned an external auditor to study and examine the company's situation. The preliminary information that was identified to the external auditor based on the actuary indicates that there may be override committed against the company. As a result, the Agency has issued a number of resolutions that the company must execute to strive to correct its financial situation within a specified period, with the last resolution sent to the company on 4/8/1435H corresponding to 2/6/2014."

And since the company had received during the last period a number of resolutions from the Saudi Arabian Monetary Agency which it did not disclose according to the applicable required regulations.

And based on the Capital Market Law and its implementing regulations, the CMA's Board issued its resolution dated 6/8/1435H corresponding to 4/6/2014 to suspend the trading of Weqaya Takaful Insurance and Reinsurance Company shares in the Saudi Stock Exchange (Tadawul) starting from Wednesday 6/8/1435H corresponding to 4/6/2014, until the company discloses any material developments in accordance with the requirements of the Capital Market Law and its implementing regulations, in light of the resolutions it had received from the Agency during the past period to correct its financial situation. Accordingly, CMA will consider whether to continue the trade suspension of the company's shares or not.

References

External links

Weqaya Takaful Insurance and Reinsurance Company website (Saudi Arabia)

2009 establishments in Saudi Arabia
Financial services companies established in 2009
Companies listed on Tadawul
Companies based in Riyadh
Insurance companies of Saudi Arabia